Ahvanu (also Romanized as Āhvānū, Āhevānū, and Ahovanoo; also known as Ayānu and Eynū) is a village in Rudbar Rural District, in the Central District of Damghan County, Semnan Province, Iran. At the 2006 census, its population was 606, in 172 families.

History
Nearby, Darius III was murdered by Bessus.

The village was damaged in the 856 Damghan earthquake.

References 

Populated places in Damghan County
Qumis (region)